Guillermo Robazoglio da Casale (died 1442) was an Italian Franciscan who became the 32nd Minister General of his order. In that capacity he took part in the Council of Florence.

Notes

1442 deaths
15th-century Italian Christian monks
Year of birth unknown
Ministers General of the Order of Friars Minor